Tsar Simeon may refer to:

 Simeon I of Bulgaria, ruled over the First Bulgarian Empire 893–927
 Simeon Saxe-Coburg-Gotha or Simeon II of Bulgaria, de jure Tsar of Bulgaria 1943–1946, later elected Prime Minister of Bulgaria, served 2001–2005
 Simeon Bekbulatovich, de jure Tsar of Russia (1575–1576) (Ivan the Terrible was the Tsar de facto)